Margo Martindale is an American character actress who has appeared on television, film, and stage. In 2011, she won a Primetime Emmy Award and a Critics' Choice Television Award for her recurring role as Mags Bennett on Justified. She was nominated for an Emmy Award four times for her recurring role as Claudia on The Americans, winning it in 2015 and 2016. She has had starring roles in the films August: Osage County (2013), Uncle Frank (2020), and Cocaine Bear (2023), as well as supporting roles in a number of others, including The Rocketeer (1991), Lorenzo's Oil (1992), The Firm (1993), Dead Man Walking (1995), Marvin's Room (1996), ...First Do No Harm (1997), The Hours (2002), Million Dollar Baby (2004), Paris, je t'aime (2006), Eye of God (2007), Walk Hard: The Dewey Cox Story (2007), The Savages (2007), Hannah Montana: The Movie (2009), Orphan (2009), Secretariat (2010), Forged (2010) and Win Win (2011). She was nominated for a Tony Award for Best Featured Actress in 2004 for her performance in the play Cat on a Hot Tin Roof. She also voiced a fictionalized version of herself in the Netflix adult-animated show BoJack Horseman.

Early life
Martindale was born in Jacksonville, Texas, the youngest of three children and only daughter of William Everett and Margaret ( Pruitt) Martindale. In addition to owning and operating a lumber company in Jacksonville, her father was known as a champion dog handler in Texas and throughout the Southern United States. 

Her oldest brother is the professional golfer and golf course designer Billy Martindale. The middle child, brother Bobby Tim, died in 2004. Margo participated in golf, cheerleading and drama at school, and was crowned Football Sweetheart and Miss Jacksonville High School 1969.

Following graduation in 1969, she attended Lon Morris College, then transferred to the University of Michigan at Ann Arbor. While at Michigan, she attended summer courses at Harvard University, appearing onstage with future movie and TV stars Jonathan Frakes and Christopher Reeve.

Career

Theatre
In the early 1980s, Martindale worked for four years at the Actors Theatre, Louisville, Kentucky, where she became good friends with fellow actress Kathy Bates.

Martindale made her Broadway debut in 2004 as Big Mama in Cat on a Hot Tin Roof, for which she received a Tony Award nomination for Best Featured Actress in a Play.

Prior to that, she starred in several off-Broadway stage productions, most notably originating the role of Truvy Jones in the first production of Steel Magnolias, and starring in its first national tour.

Film
Martindale's film roles include turns as Susan Sarandon's character's fellow nun in Dead Man Walking, and, again with Sarandon, in Lorenzo's Oil. She appeared as Leonardo DiCaprio's character's doctor in Marvin's Room; and as Hilary Swank's character's selfish mother in Million Dollar Baby. Other films include The Human Stain with Anthony Hopkins and Nicole Kidman, Nobody's Fool with Paul Newman, 28 Days with Sandra Bullock, Proof of Life with Russell Crowe and Meg Ryan, and Practical Magic, again with Nicole Kidman and Sandra Bullock. She was featured in Paris, je t'aime. She played Mama Cox in the 2007 film Walk Hard, played Ruby in Hannah Montana: The Movie and played Miss Elizabeth Ham in the movie Secretariat.

Martindale had a role in August: Osage County (2013), a film adaptation of the Pulitzer Prize-winning play by Tracy Letts. She played Mattie Fae Aiken, the sister of lead character Violet Weston (Meryl Streep). Filming took place in the fall and winter of 2012.

Television
Martindale has been described as a character actress. 

One of her first television roles came in the miniseries Lonesome Dove. A series of character and guest appearances followed in a wide range of TV shows. Martindale played recurring character Camilla Figg on the first three seasons of Dexter and had a recurring role in the A&E courtroom drama 100 Centre Street with Alan Arkin.

From 2007 to 2008, she had a recurring role as Nina Burns, a neighbor of the Malloy/"Rich" family in The Riches with Minnie Driver and Eddie Izzard.

In 2011, Martindale joined the cast of Justified for the second season. She played the role of Mags Bennett, matriarch of the Bennett crime family which controlled much of the drug activity in the fictional version of Harlan County, Kentucky. She won the Primetime Emmy Award for Outstanding Supporting Actress in a Drama Series for her performance.

After learning of the nomination, Martindale told CNN she hoped that it would open up more doors for older women in Hollywood. "People really identify with this character [Mags Bennett] and I think it's because it is a character that is powerful and older and extremely mean", she said. She won Best Supporting Actress in a Drama Series at the Critics' Choice Television Awards for her role as Mags Bennett.

In February 2012 it was announced Martindale had been cast in the ABC comedy pilot Counter Culture, which was not picked up.

Martindale returned to television in late January 2013 in the spy drama The Americans on FX Network. She played Claudia, the KGB "handler" of two Soviet spies living in 1980s Cold War America.

She co-starred in the sitcom The Millers on CBS. In 2015, she began a recurring role as Ruth Eastman, Peter Florrick's new campaign manager on The Good Wife. Martindale took up the role of Ruth again in 2018 in season two of The Good Fight, the sequel to The Good Wife. She appears as a fictionalized version of herself on the Netflix animated comedy BoJack Horseman. Her fictional version is easily angered and temperamentally violent, moonlighting as a bank robber and going on frequent criminal heists. BoJack consistently refers to her as "Esteemed Character Actress Margo Martindale", while most other characters begin addressing her with "Beloved."

Martindale played Audrey Bernhardt, matriarch of the family on the Amazon series Sneaky Pete starring Giovanni Ribisi, for the 2015 pilot, the first season which aired in January 2017, and the second and third seasons as well. She also played Mike's ‘Aunt Rosemary’ in two episodes of Mike & Molly.

In 2020, Martindale portrayed US Congresswoman Bella Abzug on the FX miniseries Mrs. America and received a nomination for the Primetime Emmy Award for Outstanding Supporting Actress in a Limited Series or Movie.

Podcasts

I Spy, a podcast hosted by Martindale and produced by Foreign Policy, was released in November, 2019.

Personal life
Martindale has been married to musician Bill Boals since 1986. They have a daughter, Margaret.

Filmography

Film

Television

Awards and nominations

References

External links
 
 
 
 

20th-century American actresses
21st-century American actresses
Actresses from Texas
American film actresses
American stage actresses
American television actresses
Living people
Lon Morris College alumni
Outstanding Performance by a Supporting Actress in a Drama Series Primetime Emmy Award winners
People from Jacksonville, Texas
University of Michigan alumni
University of Michigan School of Music, Theatre & Dance alumni
Year of birth missing (living people)